Captain William Davies Evans (27 January 1790 – 3 August 1872) was a seafarer and inventor, though he is best known today as a chess player. He is buried at the Belgian port of Ostend.

Early life 
Evans was born at St Dogwells, Pembrokeshire, Wales. It is almost certain that young Evans went to Haverfordwest Grammar School, the only school of any antiquity in Pembrokeshire. About the beginning of the century the family moved to Castle Pill, the name of an inlet of Milford Haven on the north side, just east of Milford town.  By 1818, he had learned the moves of chess.

Early career 

Evans served at sea in the navy from 1804, when he was 14, until the Napoleonic Wars ended in 1815.

He was then transferred to the postal department. By 1819, he had reached the title of Captain of the sailing packet.

Around 1825–1826, on shore leave in London, Evans played Alexander McDonnell, beating the latter with what is now regarded in chess circles as the first Evans Gambit (1.e4 e5 2.Nf3 Nc6 3.Bc4 Bc5 4.b4).  According to GM Andrew Soltis, Evans was "the first player to be widely honored for an opening we know he played".

Inventions 
Evans is known for inventing tri-coloured lighting on naval vessels designed to prevent collisions at night. For this invention he was awarded £1500 by the British government and a gold chronometer and £200 from the Tsar of Russia.

Gallery

References

External links
 
 Welsh Chess Union: William Davies Evans Ceremony 19th October 2019
 Captain Evans and his gambit in 19th century

1790 births
1872 deaths
Welsh chess players
People from Milford Haven
Welsh inventors
Sea captains
19th-century chess players